This is a list of the songs that reached number one in Mexico in 1977, according to Billboard magazine with data provided by Radio Mil. Also included are the number-one songs according to the Record World magazine.

Chart history (Billboard)

Chart history (Record World)

See also
1977 in music

References

Sources
Print editions of the Billboard magazine.

1977 in Mexico
Mexico
Lists of number-one songs in Mexico